Sheriff Sinyan (born 19 July 1996) is a professional footballer who plays as a defensive midfielder for Molde FK. Born in Norway, he represents The Gambia internationally.

Club career
Sinyan played youth football for Oppsal IF and Holmlia SK, and also featured briefly in Holmlia's senior team before joining the junior ranks of larger club Lillestrøm.

In April 2016, Sinyan signed a two-year contract with Lillestrøm SK's senior team. Sinyan featured in the first two rounds of both the 2015 and 2016 Norwegian Football Cups, and made his league debut with substitute appearances against Sarpsborg 08 and Strømsgodset in July 2016.

After 2016 Sinyan suffered a long-time injury period, not making his comeback until September 2018 for Lillestrøm's B team.

On 30 June 2020, Molde FK announced the signing of Sinyan on a three-year contract from Lillestrøm.

International career
Sinyan made his Gambia national team debut on 12 June 2019 in a friendly against Morocco, as a half-time substitute for Ebou Adams.

Career statistics

Club

External links

References

1996 births
Living people
Norwegian people of Gambian descent
People with acquired Gambian citizenship
Footballers from Oslo
Gambian footballers
Norwegian footballers
Association football midfielders
The Gambia international footballers
Holmlia SK players
Lillestrøm SK players
Molde FK players
Eliteserien players
Norwegian Third Division players